Progress 22 was a Soviet uncrewed Progress cargo spacecraft, which was launched in May 1984 to resupply the Salyut 7 space station.

Launch
Progress 22 launched on 28 May 1984 from the Baikonur Cosmodrome in the Kazakh SSR. It used a Soyuz-U rocket.

Docking
Progress 22 docked with the aft port of Salyut 7 on 30 May 1984 at 15:47 UTC, and was undocked on 15 July 1984 at 13:36 UTC.

Decay
It remained in orbit until 15 July 1984, when it was deorbited. The deorbit burn occurred at 18:52:00 UTC, with the mission ending at around 19:35 UTC.

See also

 1984 in spaceflight
 List of Progress missions
 List of uncrewed spaceflights to Salyut space stations

References

Progress (spacecraft) missions
1984 in the Soviet Union
Spacecraft launched in 1984
Spacecraft which reentered in 1984
Spacecraft launched by Soyuz-U rockets